Abb Takk is an Urdu private Pakistani news channel based in Karachi, owned and operated by Apna TV Group, launched on 19 April 2013 by Syed Fahad Hussain Shah.

Current programmes
 Rupiya Paisa with Ali Nasir
 Tonight with Fareeha 
 Benaqaab
 Hazraat
 Khufia

See also 
 List of news channels in Pakistan

References

External links 

Television stations in Pakistan
Television channels and stations established in 2013
Television stations in Karachi
24-hour television news channels in Pakistan
Urdu-language mass media